ISYS:desktop is an enterprise-class desktop search tool designed to find information on individual PCs as well as across corporate networks, databases and proprietary systems.  It was originally introduced in 1989 by ISYS Search Software as a search and retrieval tool for DOS.

In 2006 it could be compared to Google's search appliance.

While the personal was available the Enterprise Edition was required to search content repositories such as Documentum, SharePoint and Interwoven.

References

External links 

Desktop search engines